Ala-Too, Ala-Dag, Alatau may refer to:

Alatau, several mountain ranges in Central Asia and Siberia
Alatau, Kazakhstan, a settlement in Kazakhstan
Ala-Too Square, the central square in Bishkek, Kyrgyzstan
Alatau (Almaty Metro), a metro station located in Almaty, Kazakhstan
Grand Alatau, a residential building project in Nur-Sultan, Kazakhstan
Alatau Sports Palace, Nur-Sultan, Kazakhstan
Alatau cattle, a breed of cattle from Kazakhstan and Kyrgyzstan

See also 
 Aladağ (disambiguation)